Paula K. Hagedorn Diehr is an American biostatistician whose research topics generally concern health systems and ageing, and have included work on spatial variability and longitudinal data, health care utilization, mental health, insurance, diagnosis, and prediction of healthy life expectancies. She is a professor emerita of biostatistics, with a joint appointment in health systems and population health, at the University of Washington.

Education and career
Diehr graduated from Harvey Mudd College in 1963. She went to the University of California, Los Angeles for graduate study, earning a master's degree and Ph.D. in biostatistics there. Her 1970 doctoral dissertation, The Mixture Problem in Tiny Samples, was supervised by Wilfrid Dixon. She joined the University of Washington faculty in 1970.

Recognition
Diehr was named a Fellow of the American Statistical Association in 1994, a Fellow of the Association for Health Services Research in 1996, and a Fellow of the American Association for the Advancement of Science in 1997.

In 2013 Harvey Mudd College gave her their HMC Outstanding Alumni Award.

References

External links
Home page

Year of birth missing (living people)
Living people
American statisticians
American women statisticians
Harvey Mudd College alumni
University of California, Los Angeles alumni
University of Washington faculty
Fellows of the American Statistical Association
Fellows of the American Association for the Advancement of Science
21st-century American women